Geoffrey Ashall Glaister (1917–1985) of Leeds was a librarian with the British Council who wrote several important works of reference relating to the book. Glaister began his career in librarianship in 1934 at Bradford Public Libraries. He served in more than fourteen different countries with the British Council. Glaister was a life member of the Bibliographical Society and the Printing History Society.

On his death, he left half of his £122,645 estate to the British Council Benevolent Fund.

Selected publications

Glossary of the Book. London: George Allen & Unwin, 1960. (Published in the United States simultaneously as the Encyclopedia of the Book, Cleveland, World Publishing Company.)
Encyclopedia of the Book. 2nd edn. New Castle, DE, and London: Oak Knoll Press & The British Library, 1996.  (With a new introduction by Donald Farren)

References

1917 births
1985 deaths
English librarians